Albert Pinto Ko Gussa Kyoon Aata Hai is a 1980 Indian Hindi-language drama film directed and written by Saeed Akhtar Mirza. The film starred Naseeruddin Shah, Shabana Azmi and Smita Patil in the lead roles.

It won the 1981 Filmfare Critics Award for Best Movie

Synopsis
The film captures the anger of a worker, in Mumbai exemplified by a young Christian car mechanic, Albert Pinto (Naseeruddin Shah), who is under the illusion that if he works hard and emulates the rich, one day he can also be successful. He makes friendly relations with his customers, who are usually the rich of the city and who keep telling him that good workers do not go on strike, and that strikes are the handiwork of low-class elements. Pinto gets angry with the supposedly wrong attitudes of the workers who he assumes go on strike under any pretext.  However, when Pinto's father, who is a mill worker is abused by the low-class elements hired by the mill owners, he realizes that it is not the workers, but the capitalists who should be blamed for the plight of the workers. He also realizes the legitimacy of strikes. Towards the end of the movie, Pinto still remains an angry man; but now his anger is directed against the capitalists, not the striking workers.

Cast

 Naseeruddin Shah as Albert Pinto
 Shabana Azmi as Stella D'Costa
 Smita Patil as Joan Pinto
 Dilip Dhawan as Dominic Pinto
 Sulabha Deshpande	as Mrs. Pinto, Albert's mother
 Arvind Deshpande as Mr. Pinto, Albert's father
 Rohini Hattangadi	as Vivek's wife
 Achyut Potdar as Chandumal Potdar (mill owner)
 Mushtaq Khan as The Lecherous Shopper tying to flirt with Joan Pinto 
 Anjali Paigankar 
 Om Puri as Madhu (mechanic)
 Satish Shah
 Avtar Gill
 Utpal Dutt
 Naresh Suri
 Nitin Sethi

Crew
 Assistant script writer: Sudhir Mishra
 Assistant Director: Ajay Mishra
 Costume Design: Jennifer Mirza, Kundan Shah

Awards and nominations

|-
| 1981
| Saeed Akhtar Mirza
| Filmfare Critics Award for Best Movie
| 
|}

Remake
In 2017 the film was remade with the same title. With a cast of Manav Kaul, Nandita Das and Saurabh Shukla, the official remake was directed by Soumitra Ranade. It was premiered at 1st edition of Singapore South Asian Film Festival held from 1 to 10 September 2017. It released in theaters on 12 April 2019.

References

External links

 Albert Pinto Ko Gussa Kyon Aata Hai Review

1980s Hindi-language films
1980 films
Films directed by Saeed Akhtar Mirza
Indian drama films